Eagle-Vail is an unincorporated community in Eagle County, Colorado, United States. Eagle-Vail is located along Interstate 70 and the Eagle River. A former census-designated place (CDP), the population was 2,887 at the 2000 census.

Description
The area is located in the heart of the Eagle River Valley in Eagle County. Located between  Vail and Avon, Eagle-Vail is a residential community of 1,400+ homes with a diverse mix of year-round residents and second homeowners. Eagle Vail is managed by the Eagle-Vail Metro District and Eagle-Vail Property Owners Association and is the site of the Eagle-Vail Golf Club.

Geography
Eagle-Vail is located at coordinates .

Demographics

Eagle-Vail transportation
Eagle-Vail is served by Eagle County Airport, which is near Gypsum.

 Interstate 70 runs east-west through the middle of Eagle-Vail. U.S. Route 6 also passes through the community.

Eagle-Vail is served by ECO Transit, a bus public transportation service.

See also

References

External links

 
 Vail Daily News official website
 Vail Valley Partnership The Chamber and Tourism Bureau
 Eagle-Vail Golf Course
 Eagle County website

Unincorporated communities in Eagle County, Colorado
Former census-designated places in Colorado
Unincorporated communities in Colorado